Hilton Brown may refer to:

 Hilton Brown (writer) (1890–1961), Scottish writer and Indian Civil Service officer
 Hilton Brown (swimmer) (born 1946), New Zealand swimmer and swimming coach